The Gold Coast Blaze were an Australian men's professional basketball team which competed in the National Basketball League (NBL). The Blaze competed in their inaugural season in 2007–08. The club was based on the Gold Coast and joined the Cairns Taipans, Townsville Crocodiles as the other two NBL clubs from Queensland. The Blaze played its home games at the Gold Coast Convention Centre (GCCEC) in Broadbeach, known as "The Furnace" within the NBL. The team was not related to the previous Gold Coast representative in the NBL, the Gold Coast Rollers.

History
The first official reports of a new Gold Coast franchise surfaced in September 2006. Former Gold Coast Rollers and Adelaide 36ers head coach Dave Claxton spearheaded a bid for a new NBL license for the Gold Coast. On 21 November 2006, the NBL Board officially accepted the bid and announced the addition of a new Gold Coast franchise and reported that the club would compete out of the 5,269 seat Gold Coast Convention and Exhibition Centre.

At the beginning of 2007 the newly founded Gold Coast franchise held a competition to name the club. The franchise offered four options to choose from including the 'Heat', 'Marlins', 'Flyers' and 'Waves', as well as the ability to suggest another alternative. On 23 February the franchise announced that it would compete under the 'Blaze' moniker. Despite the 'Heat' name being voted the most popular in the naming competition, club officials decided it would be best to steer clear of the name following objections from the NBA, due to the name being held by American franchise the Miami Heat. Another Queensland based NBL franchise, the Townsville Crocodiles had had the same trouble in 1998: founded as the Townsville Suns in 1993, they were forced to change to the Crocodiles in 1998 because the NBA's Phoenix Suns had the "Suns" moniker trademarked.

Prior to the official naming of the franchise, the Blaze made their first major signing on 18 January in signing former Wollongong Hawks head coach Brendan Joyce as their inaugural head coach. Following this signing, two days later the club signed former West Sydney Razorbacks head coach Mark Watkins as the assistant coach.

On 5 April the Blaze announced the signing of their first player: former West Sydney Razorbacks captain Scott McGregor. On 2 May, Juaquin Hawkins was signed as the first import.

In the 2008–09 season, Shane Heal, the former South Dragons captain/coach joined the team along with Pero Cameron & Casey Frank.

On 17 July 2012, the Gold Coast Blaze owners, Owen and Ben Tomlinson, decided to withdraw their bid to stay in the NBL for the 2012–13 season.

Notable former players
  Shane Heal 1 season: '08-'09
  Luke Whitehead 2 seasons: '07-'09
  Sam Dogan 2 seasons: '07-'09
  Ben Melmeth 2 seasons: '07-'09
  Scott McGregor 2 seasons: '07-'09
  Ater Majok 1 season: '11-'11
  Mark Worthington 2 seasons: '10-'12
  Adris Deleon 1 season: '11-'12
  Chris Goulding 3 seasons: '09-'12
  Jason Cadee 2 seasons: '10-'12
  Anthony Petrie 3 seasons: '09-'12
  Pero Cameron 3 seasons: '07-'10

Honour roll

Season by season

See also
Sports on the Gold Coast, Queensland

References

External links
Gold Coast Blaze History at andthefoul.net

 
Defunct National Basketball League (Australia) teams
Basketball teams in Queensland
Basketball teams established in 2007
Basketball teams disestablished in 2012
2007 establishments in Australia
2012 disestablishments in Australia
Sporting teams based on the Gold Coast, Queensland